Hsu Hung-chih (4 January 1937 – 28 January 2018) was a Taiwanese politician.

He studied economics at Soochow University and became a teacher in Taichung. In 1967, Hsu was first elected to the Taoyuan County Council. He was reelected twice thereafter as a county council member. Hsu became county magistrate in 1981, due to the support of Hokkien-speaking voters in Taoyuan supportive of the Kuomintang. Upon the end of his second term, Hsu was succeeded by Liu Pang-yu, who took office backed by Hakka voters affiliated with the Kuomintang. Hsu died of lung cancer at the age of 81 on 28 January 2018.

References

1937 births
2018 deaths
Deaths from lung cancer
Deaths from cancer in Taiwan
Kuomintang politicians in Taiwan
Magistrates of Taoyuan County
Soochow University (Taiwan) alumni
Taiwanese schoolteachers